Pedro Vicente Maldonado is a canton in the west of the province of Pichincha in Ecuador. It is named after the 18th-century Ecuadoran scientist Pedro Vicente Maldonado. Arashá Spa, a tropical forest resort, is located in this canton.

References

Cantons of Pichincha Province